Jello Jello (possibly from Aymara and Quechua q'illu yellow, the reduplication indicates that there is a group or a complex of something, "a complex of yellow", q'illu  q'illu a plant (Berberis bumaelifolia), is a mountain in the Andes of Peru, about  high. It is situated in the Arequipa Region, Caylloma Province, in the districts Callalli and Chivay. Jello Jello lies northeast of a higher mountain named Huarancante. There is a small lake northwest of the mountain named Jello Jello.

References 

Mountains of Peru
Mountains of Arequipa Region